Ringling may refer to:

People
Ringling brothers, seven American siblings of one America's largest circuses
 Charles Edward Ringling (1863–1926), circus owner
 John Ringling (1866–1936), circus owner
 Otto Ringling (1858–1911), American circusman and businessman
Henry Ringling North (1909–1993), American businessman, as a circus proprietor
John Ringling North (1903–1985), a president and director of the Ringling Bros. and Barnum & Bailey Circus
 Mable Burton Ringling (1875–1929), art collector

Places
 Ringling, Montana
 Ringling, Oklahoma
 Ringling Bridge

Institutions
Ringling Brothers Circus (1884–1919), a circus founded in Wisconsin, United States in 1884
Ringling Bros. and Barnum & Bailey Circus (1919–2017),  an American traveling circus company
Ringling College of Art and Design, a private college focused on art and design
Ringling Museum of Art
Ringling International Arts Festival, an annual festival at the Ringling Museum of Art